Cathy George is a college women's volleyball coach. She began her coaching career at North Dakota State, coaching there for two years. She moved on to coach Texas-Arlington and made the NCAA tournament twice with the team. She coached Western Michigan next, appearing in the NCAA tournament in 2000 and receiving MAC Coach of the Year. George was most recently the head coach of the Michigan State Spartans and retired at the end of the 2021 season.

Early life
Cathy George graduated from Illinois State in 1985. She lettered in volleyball all four years at the university. While on the team, they won three consecutive conference titles and had three consecutive NCAA tournament appearances. George was a team captain. She also earned All-MVC three times.

George earned her Master's degree in Education from Central Michigan in 1987. She is married and has two sons.

Coaching career

North Dakota State
George spent two years coaching at North Dakota State, finishing with an overall record of 87-11. She was the NCAA Division II Coach of the Year and the North Central Conference Coach of the Year twice.

Texas-Arlington
Starting in 1989, George coached the Texas-Arlington volleyball team. George coached there for five seasons, finishing with a record of 93-74. She was a three-time Southland Conference Coach of the Year.

The 1989 team finished third in the NCAA tournament, a school record, and she became the first female to coach in the Final Four.

Western Michigan
George began coaching Western Michigan in 1994. She coached for eleven seasons, culminating in a 185-139 overall record.

She was the MAC coach of the year in 2000; the team made the NCAA tournament that year.

Michigan State
George started coaching the Michigan State volleyball team in 2005. She said that it was always her dream to coach in the Big Ten. She was announced as the head coach a week after Chuck Erbe retired. The team was ranked ninth in the Big Ten preseason polls. She retired at the end of the 2021 season, being the winningest coach in program history, with a record of 302-233. She also led the Spartans to 10 NCAA Appearances.

Head coaching record

References

Year of birth missing (living people)
Living people
Illinois State Redbirds women's volleyball players
North Dakota State Bison women's volleyball coaches
UT Arlington Mavericks women's volleyball coaches
Western Michigan Broncos women's volleyball coaches
Michigan State Spartans women's volleyball coaches
American volleyball coaches